Haroon Yusuf (born 6 March 1958) is an Indian politician from the INC. He served as the Minister of Food & Civil Supplies Department and Industries Department in the Government of Delhi of the Indian National Congress, headed by Mrs. Sheila Dikshit. He also served as the working president of the Delhi Congress.

Early life and education
Yusuf was born on 6 March 1958 in Delhi to Mohd. Yusuf. He pursued M.Com. from Zakir Husain Delhi College, University of Delhi. In 1988, he was elected as the Secretary of Delhi Pradesh Youth Congress and took the charge of Chairman, Anti-Narcotic Cell, All India Youth Congress Wing and in 1989 he was appointed Joint Secretary of All India Youth Congress Wing.

Political career
He was elected to the Delhi Legislative Assembly for the first time in 1993 from Ballimaran and since then had been elected in every assembly elections from the same constituency till 2015. In 2013 Delhi Legislative Assembly election, he was elected for the fifth time from Ballimaran constituency.
He is the first elected Chairman of Delhi Waqf Board (1999-2004).

In 2001, he became Minister of Development, Revenue, Irrigation & Flood Control and Food & Supplies Department in Delhi government.
In 2003, he was the Minister of Power & Transport.
In 2008, he took the position of Minister of Food & Civil Supplies and Industries Department.

In 2015 Delhi Legislative Assembly election, for the first time, he lost the election to Imran Hussain of the Aam Aadmi Party.

Positions held

References

1958 births
Living people
Indian Muslims
Indian National Congress politicians from Delhi
All India Indira Congress (Tiwari) politicians
State cabinet ministers of Delhi
People from Delhi
Delhi University alumni
Delhi MLAs 2013–2015
Delhi MLAs 2008–2013
Delhi MLAs 1998–2003
Delhi MLAs 2003–2008